The music of the video game Final Fantasy IX was composed by regular series composer Nobuo Uematsu. It was his last exclusive Final Fantasy score. The Final Fantasy IX Original Soundtrack, a compilation of all music in the game, was originally released on four Compact Discs by DigiCube in 2000, and was re-released by Square Enix in 2004. A Best Of and arranged soundtrack album of musical tracks from the game entitled Final Fantasy IX: Uematsu's Best Selection was released in 2000 by Tokyopop Soundtrax. Final Fantasy IX Original Soundtrack PLUS, an album of music from the game's full motion videos and extra tracks, was released by DigiCube in 2000 and re-released in 2004, and a collection of piano arrangements of pieces from the original soundtrack arranged by Shirō Hamaguchi and performed by Louis Leerink was released as Piano Collections Final Fantasy IX in 2001.

The game's soundtrack is best known for "Melodies of Life," the theme song of the game, performed by Emiko Shiratori in Japanese and English. The song was released as a single by King Records in 2000. The soundtrack was based around a theme of medieval music, and was heavily inspired by previous Final Fantasy games, incorporating themes and motifs from earlier soundtracks. The music was overall well received; reviewers found the soundtrack to be both well done and enjoyable, though opinions were mixed as to the reliance on music of previous games. Several tracks, especially "Melodies of Life", "Roses of May", "Vamo' Alla Flamenco" and "Not Alone" remain popular today, and have been performed numerous times in orchestral concert series, as well as being published in arranged and compilation albums by Square as well as outside groups.

Creation and influence
In discussions with director Hiroyuki Ito, Uematsu was told: "It'd be fine if you compose tracks for the eight characters, an exciting battle track, a gloomy, danger-evoking piece, and around ten tracks or so". However, Uematsu spent an estimated year composing and producing "around 160" pieces for Final Fantasy IX, with 140 appearing in the game.

Uematsu composed with a piano, and used two contrasting methods: "I create music that fits the events in the game, but sometimes, the event designer will adjust a game event to fit the music I've already written". Uematsu felt previous games Final Fantasy VII and VIII had a mood of realism, but that IX was more of a fantasy, so "a serious piece as well as silly, fun pieces could fit in". He felt the theme was medieval music, and was given a two-week break to travel in Europe for inspiration, such as looking at old castles in Germany and other locations. However, the music was not entirely composed in the medieval mode, as Uematsu claims that "it would be unbalanced" and "a little boring". He aimed for a "simple, warm" style and included uncommon instruments such as a kazoo and dulcimer. Uematsu also included motifs from older Final Fantasy games "because Final Fantasy IX was returning to the roots, so to speak" and incorporated ideas such as "the old intro for battle music" and arranged the Volcano theme from Final Fantasy and the Pandemonium theme from Final Fantasy II, as well as others from the series. Uematsu has claimed several times that Final Fantasy IX is his favorite work, as well as the one he is most proud of. He also stated in the liner notes for the Final Fantasy IX: Original Soundtrack album that he was "glad that [he] was able to join this project".

Albums

FINAL FANTASY IX Original Soundtrack

Final Fantasy IX Original Soundtrack is a soundtrack album containing musical tracks from the game, composed, arranged and produced by Nobuo Uematsu. It spans four discs and 110 tracks, covering a duration of 4:46:31. It was first released on 30 August 2000 by DigiCube, and subsequently re-released on 10 May 2004 by Square Enix. The lyrics for the theme song to the game, "Melodies of Life", were written by Hiroyuki Ito for the Japanese version and Alexander O. Smith for the English version. The song was performed in both languages by Emiko Shiratori.

The album reached #4 on the Japan Oricon charts, and sold 101,000 copies as of January 2010. The album was well received; many reviewers found that it was a "good" soundtrack, though not without faults. Josh Bizeau and Roko Zaper of Soundtrack Central especially liked it, finding it to be "a blessing for Final Fantasy music", and both Patrick Gann of RPGFan and Isaac Engelhorn of Soundtrack Central felt it was Uematsu's second-best work to date, behind only the soundtrack of Final Fantasy VI. Ben Schweitzer of RPGFan, however, found that the heavy reliance of the soundtrack on music and themes from previous Final Fantasy soundtracks resulted in a sense of "stretched creativity" and "a bit of blandness", though he still felt it was not "a bad soundtrack... [but] not really a great soundtrack". Other reviewers such as Engelhorn and Tyler Schulley of "Final Fantasy Symphony", enjoyed the fact that it pulled from previous soundtracks, feeling that it gave the album "the classic feel of the older Final Fantasies" while still being "original and beautiful".

Track listing

 Literal translation of the original titles appear in (brackets) if different.

Final Fantasy IX: Uematsu's Best Selection

Final Fantasy IX: Uematsu's Best Selection is a soundtrack album composed of popular musical tracks from the Final Fantasy IX: Original Soundtrack album. It was arranged by Nobuo Uematsu, Shirō Hamaguchi, Kunihiko Kurosawa, and Haruo Kondo. Vocals were again performed by Emiko Shiratori for "Melodies of Life". It spans 33 tracks and covers a duration of 74:16. The first 32 tracks correspond to tracks on the Final Fantasy IX: Original Soundtrack album, while the last track, an arranged version of "A Place to Call Home", can only be found on this album. It was first released on August 21, 2000 worldwide by Tokyopop Soundtrax, with English track names. The release bears the catalog number TPCD 0201-2.

Reviewers were much less pleased with Final Fantasy IX: Uematsu's Best Selection than with the original soundtrack, finding it to have a "great track listing" but that it felt as if "[they] tried to get as many tracks on the disc as they could", with the result that many tracks were cut too short.

FINAL FANTASY IX Original Soundtrack PLUS

Final Fantasy IX Original Soundtrack PLUS is a soundtrack album consisting of pieces that did not appear on the original soundtrack. The album was composed by Nobuo Uematsu and orchestrated by Shirō Hamaguchi. Emiko Shiratori supplied the vocals for "The Song of Zidane and Dagger" and "Melodies of Life (Silent Mix)". The album contains music from the majority of the game's full motion videos and several extra tracks that did not appear in the game, which appear as tracks 34 through 41 on the album. It also contains a bonus track, an English version of "Melodies of Life" entitled "Melodies of Life (Silent Mix)", found at the last track on the album. The album spans 42 tracks and covers a duration of 66:30. It was first published by DigiCube on December 6, 2000, and subsequently re-published by Square Enix on October 20, 2004. The original release bears the catalog number SSCX-10047 and the reprint SQEX-10035.

Final Fantasy IX Original Soundtrack PLUS sold over 4,100 copies. It was very well received, with reviewers finding the tunes to have "great dynamics" and "incredibly well made", and that the "orchestrations work wonders with Uematsu's incidental music". It reached #58 on the Oricon charts.

Piano Collections: FINAL FANTASY IX

Piano Collections: Final Fantasy IX is a collection of Final Fantasy IX music composed by Nobuo Uematsu, arranged for the piano by Shirō Hamaguchi, and performed by Louis Leerink. It spans 14 tracks and covers a duration of 53:44. It was first released on January 24, 2001, in Japan by DigiCube, and subsequently re-released on July 22, 2004, by Square Enix. The original release bears the catalog number SSCX-10048 and the re-release bears the catalog number SQEX-10027. The album was well received, with reviewers finding the album "enjoyable" and "a pleasant surprise", although they did find some of the arrangements to be "a bit on the simple side".

Melodies of Life
"Melodies of Life" is the theme song of Final Fantasy IX, and consists primarily of two themes that were frequently used in the game itself, the Overworld theme (Crossing Those Hills), and a lullaby that is sung by Dagger. It was performed by Emiko Shiratori in both the Japanese and English versions, arranged by Shirō Hamaguchi, and composed, like the rest of the game, by Nobuo Uematsu. The lyrics were written by game director Hiroyuki Ito (credited as Shiomi) in the Japanese version and Alexander O. Smith in the English version. The song was released as a single by King Records on August 2, 2000, and contains both the English and Japanese versions, an instrumental version, and a bonus track named "Galway Sky". The single covers a duration of 23:17 and has a catalog number of KICS-811. Melodies of Life reached #10 on the Oricon charts, and sold 100,000 copies.

Legacy
The Black Mages have arranged four pieces from Final Fantasy IX. These are "Hunter's Chance" and "Vamo' Alla Flamenco" from the album The Skies Above, published in 2004, and "Assault of the Silver Dragons" and "Grand Cross" from the album Darkness and Starlight, published in 2008. Additionally, Uematsu continues to perform certain pieces in his Dear Friends: Music from Final Fantasy concert series. The music of Final Fantasy IX has also appeared in various official concerts and live albums, such as 20020220 music from FINAL FANTASY, a live recording of an orchestra performing music from the series including "Vamo' Alla Flamenco". Additionally, "Vamo' Alla Flamenco" was performed by the Royal Stockholm Philharmonic Orchestra and the Chicagoland Pops Orchestra for the Distant Worlds: Music from Final Fantasy concert tour, while "Not Alone" was performed by the New Japan Philharmonic Orchestra in the Tour de Japon: Music from Final Fantasy concert series. "Melodies of Life" was performed at the Press Start -Symphony of Games- 2008 concerts in Tokyo and Shanghai. "Vamo' Alla Flamenco" was played at the Fantasy Comes Alive concert in Singapore on April 30, 2010. Independent but officially licensed releases of Final Fantasy IX music have been composed by such groups as Project Majestic Mix, which focuses on arranging video game music. Selections also appear on Japanese remix albums, called dojin music, and on English remixing websites.

References

External links
 Nobuo Uematsu's official website
 Square Enix's official music store

Final Fantasy IX
Final Fantasy music
Video game soundtracks
Video game music discographies